Warren W. Matthews, Jr. (born April 5, 1939) is an American lawyer and jurist who was a justice of the Alaska Supreme Court from 1977 to 2009. Matthews  served as the 8th and 12th chief justice of the Alaska Supreme Court.  His service from May 1977 to April 2009 makes him the second-longest serving justice in Alaska history, slightly less than that of Jay Rabinowitz.

Born in Santa Cruz, California, Matthews graduated from San Benito High School in Hollister, California in 1957, where he says he was inspired to become an attorney when one paid a visit to his classroom.  He went on to earn his bachelor of arts degree from Stanford University in 1961 and his juris doctor degree from Harvard Law School in 1964.

Matthews came to Alaska in 1965 to serve as an associate at the law firm of Burr, Boney & Pease in Anchorage.  In 1969, he formed the law firm of Matthews, Dunn and Bailey.  He served as ethics committee chair for the Alaska Bar Association from 1968 to 1974.

Then, in 1977, Republican Governor Jay Hammond appointed Matthews as an associate justice of the Alaska Supreme Court.  The other Supreme Court justices elected Matthews to be the 8th chief justice from 1987 to 1990 and as the 12th chief justice from 1997 to 2000.  As chief justice, he also served concurrently as chairman of the Alaska Judicial Council.  The nation's other chief justices elected Matthews as second vice president of the Conference of Chief Justices.

Noted opinions

Matthews wrote the 4–1 majority opinion in the 1981 Supreme Court case of Nix v. Alaska, in which he ruled that an undercover police officer gaining access to a residence was not a violation of the Fourth Amendment prohibition against unreasonable searches and seizures, stating, "the use of undercover police agents 'is a highly necessary tool in fighting crime.'"

In 2007, Matthews dissented in the 3–2 Supreme Court decision of Alaska v. Planned Parenthood in which the Court struck down Alaska's law requiring parental consent for minors to obtain abortions while Matthews supported the law, arguing: "Without a parent's consent, [minors] may not become licensed drivers or get married or obtain general medical or dental treatment."  Later that year, Matthews wrote the dissenting opinion in the 3–2 Supreme Court decision Godfrey, d/b/a Mendenhall Valley Tesoro v. State of Alaska, Community and Economic Development, in which the court supported Alaska's law holding retailers legally liable if their employees (even unknowingly) sold tobacco to minors.  Matthews opposed the law, arguing that the law was too broad in not allowing a retailer to argue that a clerk was not negligent.

Legacy

Several of his former law clerks eventually went on to prominence in Alaskan politics: Supreme Court Justice Craig F. Stowers, Attorney General Daniel S. Sullivan, and State Representative Lindsey Holmes.

Since retiring from the Supreme Court in 2009, Matthews has served as a pro tem judge.

Personal life

Warren Matthews has been married to Donna since 1963.  They have two daughters: Holly (born ca. 1974), a psychiatric social worker;  and Meredith (born ca. 1978), an attorney in private practice.

References

1939 births
Living people
Stanford University alumni
Harvard Law School alumni
Justices of the Alaska Supreme Court
People from Santa Cruz, California
People from Hollister, California
Politicians from Anchorage, Alaska
Lawyers from Anchorage, Alaska
Chief Justices of the Alaska Supreme Court